Aden Kirk (born 3 March 1992) is an English professional darts player who competes in Professional Darts Corporation (PDC) events. Aden is also a published childrens book author with Austin Macauley Publishers

Career
In 2014, Kirk reached the last 64 in two of the six UK Open qualifiers to enter the event in the first round stage. He beat Conan Whitehead 5–4 and Gerwyn Price 5–2 to face 16-time world champion Phil Taylor in the third round. In Kirk's first televised match he caused one of the biggest shocks in the history of darts by winning 9–7. He then played Peter Wright, who had been the World Championship runner-up at the beginning of the year, and continued his amazing run by taking out two ton-plus finishes and coming back from 5–3 down to triumph 9–5. In the fifth round Kirk and Brendan Dolan shared the first 14 legs, before the Northern Irishman won the match with two 13 dart legs. Kirk earned £5,000 for his run in the tournament, by far the biggest of his career to date. In July, Kirk reached the final of the 12th Challenge Tour event of the year where he was edged out 5–4 by Brett Claydon.

In April 2015, Kirk won the third Development Tour event of the year. He saw off Jamie Lewis 4–3 in the semi-finals and Benito van de Pas 4–1 in the final. Kirk reached the last 16 of a PDC event for the first time since his UK Open exploits at the 15th Players Championship with victories over William O'Connor, Justin Pipe and Ronny Huybrechts, before he lost 6–1 to Peter Wright.

Kirk won 2016's 11th Development Tour event by beating Keegan Brown 4−3 in the final. He also reached the final of the 16th event and lost 4−1 to Dean Reynolds. He finished third on the Order of Merit, but won a two-year Tour Card after first placed Reynolds decided to remain in the BDO.

World Championship results

PDC
2019: 1st round (lost to Gabriel Clemens 0–3)

References

External links
 

Living people
Professional Darts Corporation former tour card holders
English darts players
1992 births
Sportspeople from Nottingham